Nozno is a small settlement in the Municipality of Brda in the Littoral region of Slovenia.

The local church, built about 1 km west of the settlement, is dedicated to Saints Peter and Paul and belongs to the Parish of Gradno.

References

External links
Nozno on Geopedia

Populated places in the Municipality of Brda